The 2018 Toruń FIM Speedway Grand Prix of Poland was the tenth and final race of the 2018 Speedway Grand Prix season. It took place on October 6 at the Marian Rose MotoArena in Toruń, Poland.

Riders 
First reserve Niels-Kristian Iversen replaced the injured Patryk Dudek, while second reserve Václav Milík Jr. replaced the injured Craig Cook. The Speedway Grand Prix Commission also nominated Daniel Kaczmarek as the wild card, and Igor Kopeć-Sobczyński and Dominik Kubera both as Track Reserves.

Results 
The Grand Prix was won by Tai Woffinden, who beat Artem Laguta, Emil Sayfutdinov and Niels-Kristian Iversen in the final. Woffinden was crowned world champion for the third time in his career when finishing second in the second semi-final, while his nearest rival Bartosz Zmarzlik was eliminated. Laguta had initially top scored during the qualifying heats, scoring a 15-point maximum, but was denied a full maximum when finishing second to Woffinden in the final.

Heat details

Final Classification

References 

Poland 3
Speedway Grand Prix
Grand
Speedway Grand Prix of Poland